Miriama Te Rangimarie Smith (born 3 June 1976) is a New Zealand film and television actress who has played roles in various TV shows such as Xena: Warrior Princess, Karaoke High and Shortland Street. Her best-known roles, however, were the role of Moz in the third season of The Tribe, and also the role of Elsa / Principal Randall in the 2004 Power Rangers series, Power Rangers Dino Thunder. She was one of the three judges on the first season of entertainment show New Zealand's Got Talent that aired on Prime TV in 2008. She starred as Brady Trubridge on the TVNZ 2 drama series Filthy Rich.

Early life
Smith was born in Rotorua, Bay of Plenty, New Zealand. She is of Te Arawa descent.

Career
Smith started her acting career when she was a teen. She did a few commercials and a role in one episode of the TV show Shark in the Park. She was in the movie The Other Side of Heaven in 2001. She played  Elsa / Principal Randall in the 2004 Power Rangers Dino Thunder, which was filmed in New Zealand.

She starred in the 2005 Australian TV show Last Man Standing. In 2013, she starred in the movie Mt. Zion. Mt. Zion was a box office success.  From 26 February till 2 March 2014, she acted in the play Paniora!, by Briar Grace-Smith, based on the life of Manuel Huerta, at the Soundings Theatre in Te Papa.

In 2016, Smith was the presented of Finding Aroha on the Maori Television. She starred in the New Zealand show Filthy Rich in 2017. In 2018, it was announced she would be TV series adaption of the New Zealand movie The Dead Lands by streaming site Shudder.  In 2018, she was chosen to be the voice of the te reo Maori announcement of the Auckland's train system. She returned for the sequel The Other Side of Heaven 2 : Fire of Faith, which was released in 2019.

Personal life
Smith is married to Dylan Marychurch and they have a son together.

Filmography

Film

Television

References

External links
 
Johnson & Laird Agency Talent Profile 

1976 births
Living people
New Zealand film actresses
New Zealand television actresses
New Zealand Māori actresses
People from Rotorua
21st-century New Zealand actresses
20th-century New Zealand actresses
New Zealand soap opera actresses
Te Arawa people